William L. Copeland (1846 - December 30, 1885) was a police officer, government official, and state legislator in Arkansas. He was born in Ohio and studied at Oberlin College in Ohio. On March 7, 1865, at the end of the American Civil War, he joined Company C, 2nd Ohio Cavalry Regiment in the Union Army. At the end of the war, he returned to Oberlin College, where he studied from 1867–69.

He served in the Arkansas House of Representatives from 1873 until 1875 representing Crittenden County. He was appointed assessor of Crittenden County. In 1876 he was the Republican candidate for Arkansas Secretary of State. A letter he wrote to his wife survives. The Daily Arkansas Gazette described him as "Colored". He was a Republican.

Copeland may have been the first Little Rock police officer killed in the line of duty.

References

External links
Findagrave entry

1846 births
1885 deaths
Oberlin College alumni
Union Army soldiers
Republican Party members of the Arkansas House of Representatives
People from Crittenden County, Arkansas
People from Little Rock, Arkansas
Little Rock, Arkansas
African-American politicians during the Reconstruction Era
American police officers killed in the line of duty